The Marzipan Pig (1986) is a children's book by Russell Hoban. The plot involves a marzipan pig that has somehow fallen behind a couch.

Plot summary
The pig laments being forgotten and as dust begins to cover him, he remains hopeful about someone discovering him. When he is eventually found (and eaten) by a mouse, parts of his personality are transferred to the mouse. The mouse in turn, falls in love with a nearby grandfather clock and comes to visit each night. The clock, of course, cannot reciprocate the mouse's love. One night the mouse leaves never to come back. The clock suddenly feels the loss and desperately awaits her return, finally knowing both tight loneliness and cold emptiness. Alas, she does not come back and when he is next wound up, his spring breaks.

The mouse, unbeknownst to the clock, has been eaten by an owl that falls in love with a lighted taxi meter and dances for rides. Where the mouse was eaten, a little pink flower grows up. A bee drinks the flower's nectar and shows its affection to a dying hibiscus flower. A rather snooty white mouse thinks she'd make a better hibiscus and uses the dead petals to make a dress. Then, trying to hang on the plant, she falls into a postman's bag and is thrown back to the owl. Back at the house, she finds a package with a new marzipan pig - one without any knowledge of love or loneliness. The mouse eats the new marzipan pig and falls asleep. The little boy who lives in the house opens the package (it is his birthday) and finds the mouse who escapes back into its hole. The boy tells his mother that he saw a mouse in a pink dress, though his mother never believes him. This time, the mouse is not eaten by the owl, but instead dances outside in the moonlight.

Animated version
The story has been adapted in an animated television film, produced and directed by Michael Sporn.  The adaptation was animated by Tissa David and narrated by Tim Curry. The half-hour special premiered on HBO on November 5, 1990, as part of their HBO Storybook Musicals series.

References

External links

1986 children's books
American children's books
American picture books
British children's books
British picture books
Marzipan
Children's books adapted into films
English-language books
Books about pigs
Fictional owls
Books about mice and rats
Books by Russell Hoban
Jonathan Cape books